Kayin State Hluttaw is the legislature of the Burmese state of Kayin State. It is a unicameral body, consisting of 23 members, including 17 elected members and 6 military representatives. As of February 2016, the Hluttaw was led by speaker Saw Chit Khin of the National League for Democracy (NLD).

As of the 2015 general election, the National League for Democracy (NLD) won the most contested seats in the legislature.

Election results

2015

See also
State and Region Hluttaws
Pyidaungsu Hluttaw

References

Unicameral legislatures
Kayin State
Legislatures of Burmese states and regions